The Southern Sudan Legislative Assembly was established in 2005 by the Interim constitution of the Southern Sudan 2005. Pending elections in 2010, all 170 members were appointed according to the following formula as per the Comprehensive Peace Agreement (CPA): 70% of seats to SPLM, 15% to NCP, and 15% to other parties. The Assembly met in Juba, The capital of Southern Sudan and Central Equatoria State.

The last and arguably most historic sitting of the Assembly took place on 9 July 2011 at approximately 1.30 pm (Juba time) when the Declaration of Independence of South Sudan was read by the Rt. Hon. James Wani Igga, Speaker of the Southern Sudan Legislative Assembly. It was read at an open parliamentary session (sitting number 27-2011) of the Assembly in front of a large assembled audience at the Dr. John Garang Mausoleum in Juba, South Sudan.

Following the independence of the Republic of South Sudan, a new legislature was established in terms of the country's constitution. It together with the Council of States of South Sudan is the new National Legislature of South Sudan.

Members of the Legislative Assembly by party

Speakers

See also
National Legislative Assembly of South Sudan
National Legislature of South Sudan

References 

Politics of South Sudan
Political organisations based in South Sudan
Southern Sudan
2005 establishments in South Sudan
2011 disestablishments in South Sudan
Government of South Sudan